is a Japanese football player currently playing for Kagoshima United FC.

Club statistics
Updated to end of 2018 season.

1Includes J1 Promotion Playoffs.

References

External links
Profile at Kagoshima United FC
Profile at Giravanz Kitakyushu

1990 births
Living people
University of Teacher Education Fukuoka alumni
Association football people from Kagoshima Prefecture
Japanese footballers
J1 League players
J2 League players
J3 League players
Giravanz Kitakyushu players
Avispa Fukuoka players
Kagoshima United FC players
Association football midfielders